Ceratophyllus picatilis is a species of flea in the family Ceratophyllidae. It was described by Liyun and Wenzhen in 1988.

References 

Ceratophyllidae
Insects described in 1988